Peter K. Oberacker Jr. (born May 13, 1963) is an American businessman and politician. He is a member of the New York State Senate, representing, the 51st district. The boundaries of the 51st district changed following the 2020 United States redistricting cycle, and the district now includes portions of Broome, Chenango, Delaware, Otsego, Schoharie, Sullivan, and Ulster counties. First elected to the state senate in 2020, he succeeded the longtime incumbent James Seward, and assumed office in January 2021. Prior to becoming a state senator, he served in different local offices and helped launch the company FormTech Solutions.

Early life and career 
Oberacker was born in Merrick, New York. He graduated from SUNY Delhi. After graduating from college, he joined his father, also named Peter Oberacker, in operating Spicey Pete's Meats, a market in Schenevus.

Oberacker first entered the political sphere when he was elected to the Maryland Town Board, a position he held for two terms before being elected town supervisor. After two terms as supervisor, Oberacker was elected to serve as an Ostego County legislator.

In 2020, retiring Senator James Seward encouraged Oberacker to run for the senate seat that he occupied at the time. Oberacker eventually won the seat, winning 55.4 percent of the vote. He assumed office in January 2021.

Political positions

Economy 
In March 2022, Oberacker introduced a bill that would suspend New York's 48 cent a gallon gas tax.

Marijuana
Oberacker voted against the bill that legalized recreational marijuana usage in New York. The bill was signed by Governor Cuomo on March 31, 2021.

Recreation 
Oberacker's first bill to be approved by the senate was a bill that designated baseball as the official state sport of New York, an idea that was inspired by Cooperstown Elementary School students. The bill passed by a vote of 61-2.

Personal life 
Oberacker has a wife named Shannon, who he calls his "high school sweetheart". He has two children and one granddaughter. He lives in Schenevus, New York and is a member of his local fire department and EMS squad.

Electoral history

References

Republican Party New York (state) state senators
Living people
1963 births